Olivancillaria carcellesi is a species of sea snail, a marine gastropod mollusk in the family Olividae, the olives.

Description
The length of the shell varies from 25 mm to 55 mm.

Distribution
This species occurs in the Atlantic Ocean from Brazil to Argentina.

References

 Thome, J. W. 1966. Una nova Olivancillaria (Gastropoda, Olividae) nas Praias do Rio Grande do Sul, Brasil. Papéis Avulsos do Departamento de Zoologia, São Paulo 19: 163–168.
 Teso V. & Pastorino G. (2011) A revision of the genus Olivancillaria (Mollusca: Olividae) from the southwestern Atlantic. Zootaxa 2889: 1–34.

External links
 Gastyropods.com: Olivancillaria carcellesi

Olividae
Gastropods described in 1965